Kelsey Titmarsh (born 27 December 1993) is a Canadian rhythmic gymnast, who competed in the group all-around at the 2012 Olympic Games in London. She is a member of Trillium Rhythmics formally Kalev Rhythmic Gymnastics Club in Vaughan, coached by Svetlana Joukova. She became a member of the Canadian national team in 2005, and senior national athlete in 2009.

Biography
Born in North York, Ontario, she now lives in Thornhill, Ontario. Titmarsh attended Thornlea Secondary School.

Following a friend, Titmarsh began taking rhythmic gymnastics at age seven. After being noticed by her coach, she continued. In 2005, she joined the junior national team.

Around 2008, four years before the London Olympics, the group was assembled. Led by Rose Cossar, the team includes Titmarsh, Alexandra Landry, Katrina Cameron, Anjelika Reznik, and Anastasiya Muntyanu. In 2010 alone, the team competed at international competitions in Spain, France, Belarus, Mexico, Russia and Italy. The group placed 14th of 29 for the groups all-around category at the 2010 World Rhythmic Gymnastics Championships in Moscow, scoring 46.025. The event was a pre-qualifier for the Olympics.

In September 2011, the World Rhythmic Gymnastics Championships in Montpellier, France were the first qualifying event for the Olympics. Canada placed 17th with a score of 48.950. The Fédération Internationale de Gymnastique (FIG) Executive Board invited the group as the top-ranked team from the Americas in France. The team attended the 2011 Pan American Games in Guadalajara, Mexico that October. As part of the Canadian team, Titmarsh earned silver in the all-around event, scoring 47.950; bronze in the group 5 ball event, scoring 24.625; and silver in the team event with 3 ribbons and 2 hoops, scoring 24.650.

On June 29, 2012, Canadian Olympic Committee immediate past-president Michael Chambers held a press conference in Ottawa, welcoming the country's gymnasts to the Olympic team. The event highlighted the rhythmic gymnastics group. London 2012 was the first time a Canadian rhythmic gymnastic group had qualified for the Olympics. The group appeared in London for the annual Canada Day celebration in Trafalgar Square, appearing with COC CEO and Secretary General Christopher Overholt and Canadian High Commissioner for Canada to the United Kingdom Gordon Campbell.

Team qualification for the group all-around at the 2012 Summer Olympics was scheduled for August 9 and 10, with the finals on August 12.

Titmarsh and her team won the Elite Canada and Group Championships – 1st AA Senior Group national title in 2008, 2009, 2010, and 2011.

See also
 Gymnastics at the 2012 Summer Olympics

References

External links
 Kelsey Titmarsh on Twitter
 Kelsey Timarsh on Canadian Olympic Committee
 Kelsey Titmarsh on London 2012
 

1993 births
Canadian rhythmic gymnasts
Gymnasts at the 2012 Summer Olympics
Olympic gymnasts of Canada
Living people
Sportspeople from North York
Gymnasts from Toronto
Pan American Games silver medalists for Canada
Pan American Games bronze medalists for Canada
Pan American Games medalists in gymnastics
Gymnasts at the 2011 Pan American Games
Medalists at the 2011 Pan American Games
20th-century Canadian women
21st-century Canadian women